Gurmeet Singh Jolly (born 19 May 1969), also known as Shera, is an Indian celebrity bodyguard. Shera has been serving Bollywood actor Salman Khan since 1995.

Shera runs a security firm named Tiger Security, and was in charge of Grammy Award-winning singer Justin Bieber’s security during his Mumbai concert in 2017.

Early life and education
Shera was born in 19 May 1969 in Andheri, Mumbai, India. 
He studied at Damodar Das Barfiwala High School. Shera won a Mr. Mumbai junior title for bodybuilding in 1987, and came second as Mr. Maharashtra junior in 1988.

 

Gurmeet Singh Jolly joined Shiv Sena in October 2019.

Salman Khan's bodyguard
Shera has been serving Bollywood actor Salman Khan since 1995, and said "Jab tak zinda hoon, bhai ke saath rahunga" (As long as I am alive I will stay with brother).

References

External links 
 Tiger Security Services – Shera's company

1969 births
Living people
Bodyguards
Indian bodybuilders